Bello Emmanuel Oluwashina (born February 1, 1992, professionally known as Fresh VDM) is a Nigerian record producer, and musician. Known for producing Davido’s hit single “Fia” which was nominated for song of the year  and best pop single at The Headies 2018 award.

He is currently signed to Davido Music Worldwide.

Early life and education
Bello Emmanuel Oluwashina was born in Togo, lome. He spent his childhood in Lome, Togo, before returning to Nigeria as a teen.
He went to secondary school  at Vale College, Ibadan, Oyo State and studied International Relations and Diplomacy at the city's prestigious Lead City University

Career
On November 10, 2017, He produced Davido’s hit single “Fia”

In 2018 Davido officially signed him to DMW as the label in-house producer.

In 2018, he was nominated for Producer of the Year at the Soundcity MVP Awards Festival.

In 2018, He won Producer of the Year Award at All Africa Music Awards, and Producer of the Year  at the City People Entertainment Awards.

Production discography

Awards and nominations

References

Nigerian hip hop record producers
Living people

1992 births